Moranbong Sports Club (Chosŏn'gŭl: 모란봉체육단; Hanja: 牡丹峰體育團) is a North Korean football club based in Pyongyang. They play in the DPR Korea League. The highest football league in North Korea.

Current players

Achievements

See also
Moranbong

References

 
Football clubs in North Korea
Association football clubs established in 1997
Football clubs in Pyongyang
1997 establishments in North Korea